This is a list of populated places in Nigeria. Cities in bold are among the fourteenth-most populous in the country (covered in more detail at List of Nigerian cities by population):

Cities 

Aba
Abakaliki
Abeokuta
Abonnema
Abuja
Ado Ekiti
Afikpo
Akpawfu
Akure
Asaba
Awgu
Awka
Bauchi
Batagarawa
Benin City
Bida
Birnin Kebbi
Buguma
Calabar
Damaturu
Dutse
Ede
Eket
Enugu
Gombe
Gusau
Ibadan
Ife
Ikeja
Ikirun
Ikot-Abasi
Ikot Ekpene
Ilorin
Iwo
Jalingo
Jebba
Jimeta
Jos
Kabba
Kaduna
Kano
Katsina
Karu
Kontagora
Kutigi
Kumariya
Lafia
Lagos
Lekki
Lokoja
Maiduguri
Makurdi
Minna
Nnewi
Nsukka
Offa
Ogbomoso
Onitsha
Okene
Ogaminana
Omu-Aran
Ondo City
Oron
Oshogbo
Owerri
Owo
Orlu
Oyo
Port Harcourt
Potiskum
Sokoto
Suleja
Umuahia
Uyo
Warri
Wukari
Yenagoa
Yola
Zaria

See also 
 List of Nigerian cities by population
 Lists of villages in Nigeria

References

Further reading
 
 Latest Political News in Nigeria Cities

External links

 
 
 
Nigeria geography-related lists